Inder Sen Johar(16 February 1920 – 10 March 1984), better known as I. S. Johar, was an Indian actor, writer, producer and director, who excelled in comedic roles.

Early life
Inderjeet Singh Johar was born on 16th February, 1920 in Talagang City, Talagang Tehsil, Jhelum District, Punjab Province, British India (now within modern-day Talagang District, Punjab, Pakistan). He did an MA degree in Economics and Politics before completing his LLB. In August 1947, during the Partition of India, Johar was visiting Patiala with his family for a wedding when serious rioting broke out in Lahore, resulting in the Shah Alami Bazaar, once the largely Hindu quarter of the Walled City, being entirely burnt down.

Johar never returned to Lahore. For a period he worked in Jalandhar while his family remained in Delhi, before he eventually moved to Bombay, where he made his acting debut in the 1949 Hindi comedy action film Ek Thi Ladki.

Career
Johar acted in numerous Hindi films from the 1950s through to the early 1980s and appeared in international films such as Harry Black (1958), North West Frontier (1959), Lawrence of Arabia (1962) and Death on the Nile (1978), besides acting in Maya (1967), a US TV series. He also appeared in Punjabi films, including Chaddian Di Doli (1966), Nanak Nam Jahaz Hai (1969) with Prithviraj Kapoor, and Yamla Jatt with Helen.

I. S. Johar also wrote and directed films, including the partition-based Hindi movie Nastik (1954), Johar Mehmood in Goa and Johar Mehmood in Hong Kong, in which he co-starred with comedian Mehmood. These were inspired by comedy films of the Bob Hope-Bing Crosby style Road to... series. Johar was a unique and idiosyncratic individual, a lifelong liberal who poked fun at institutionalised self-satisfied smugness – an attitude which did not endear him to the essentially hierarchical and conservative Indian establishment, and led to difficulties finding finance for his unconventional screenplays. In many of his films, both those he directed and those he acted in, Sonia Sahni was the leading lady, most notably in Johar Mehmood in Goa, 1964.

He also starred in films with his own surname in the title such as Mera Naam Johar, Johar in Kashmir and Johar in Bombay, which is a testament both to his immense egotism, as well as his popularity with the common masses – for whom a movie with the Johar name was a guarantee of easy laughs, as well as subtle ironic or frankly sarcastic jibes at Indian customs, mores, superstitions and institutions. His film Nasbandi (Vasectomy) was a spoof on Prime Minister Indira Gandhi's failed policy of population control by coerced vasectomies during the period of Emergency and was "banned" when it was first released. In the plays written by him too, Johar attacks those in power. In a play on Bhutto, he writes about Pakistan's Prime Minister Zulfiqar Ali Bhutto as well as Gen Mohammed Zia-ul-Haq. Yash Chopra started his film career as an assistant director with I. S. Johar.

In 1963 he starred as "Gopal" in two Italian films directed by Mario Camerini: Kali Yug, la dea della vendetta (Kali Yug, Goddess of vengeance) and Il Mistero del tempio indiano (The secret of the Hindu temple).

He died in Bombay, on 10 March 1984.

Personal life
Johar married Ramma Bains in 1943 in Lahore. The couple became parents to two children, a son named Anil and a daughter named Ambika. Both his children worked in a handful of films in the late 1970s, including Nasbandi (1978) and 5 Rifles featuring both of them. Ramma Bains herself acted in small roles in a couple of films, most notably as Balraj Sahni's cunning sister in Garam Hawa.

Johar and Ramma were divorced; theirs was one of the earliest legal divorces in the country. After this divorce, Johar married and divorced no less than four more women (five marriages in all, and as many divorces). One of his later wives was the actress Sonia Sahni, who had made her film debut in Johar's production Johar-Mehmood in Goa (1965). None of Johar's later marriages was blessed with children.

I.S Johar is related to Yash Johar.I.S.Johar is the elder brother of Yash Johar and uncle of famous Producer and director of Hindi films Karan Johar

Awards and nominations

Filmography
Actor

 Ek Thi Ladki (1949) - Sohan
 Ek Teri Nishani (1949)
 Shrimati Ji (1952) - Chhoturam
 Nagin (1954)
 Shart (1954) - Hiten
 Nastik (1954) - Joker
 Durgesh Nandini (1956)
 Hum Sab Chor Hain (1956) - Kadkaram / Shuddhram / Sohrab / D'Souza / Kalidas / Tomson / Ayyar / Madam Kadki / Daleelchand Daleel
 Miss India (1957) - Pyarelal
 Kitna Badal Gaya Insaan (1957)
 Ek Gaon Ki Kahani (1957) - Gokul
 Harry Black (1958) - Bapu
 North West Frontier (1959) - Gupta
 Goonj Uthi Shehnai (1959) - Kanhaiya
 Bewaqoof (1960) - Johar
 Billo (1961) as Baunrar Mal  (Punjabi movie)
 Aplam Chaplam (1961)
 Mr. India (1961) - Gullu Lala / Jung Bahadur
 Lawrence of Arabia (1962) - Gasim
 Main Shadi Karne Chala (1962)
 Ma Beta (1962) - Bishan Sahay
 Banarsi Thug (1962) - lBanarasi Prasad
 Kali Yug: Goddess of Vengeance (1963) - Gopal
 The Secret Of The Hindu Temple (1963) - Gopal
 April Fool (1964) - Advocate Brijlal Sinha
 Johar-Mehmood in Goa (1965) - Ram
 Teen Devian (1965) - I.S. Johar
 Namaste Ji (1965)
 Bheegi Raat (1965) - Acharyaa Jhootlingam
 Main Wohi Hoon (1966) - Ashok
 Chaddian Di Doli (1966) - Hero
 Maya (1966) - One-Eye
 Ladka Ladki (1966) - Jagmohan / Chakor
 Johar in Kashmir (1966) - Aslam Abdul Samdani
 Dil Ne Phir Yaad Kiya (1966) - Bhagwan
 Akalmand (1966)
 Johar in Bombay (1967) - Rajesh
 Shagird (1967) - Prof. Brij Mohan Agnihotri 'Birju'
 Raaz (1967) - Rakharam Singh 'Rocky'
 Anita (1967) - Pramanand Marayan
 Shrimanji (1968) - Johar M. Gupta / Pran
 Mera Naam Johar (1968) - 008 / Johar Das
 Haye Mera Dil (1968) - Sokhanlal
 Nanak Naam Jahaz Hai (1969) - Shuka
 Pavitra Paapi (1970) - Adarshan Lala
 Do Thug (1970)
 Johny Mera Naam (1970) - Pehle Ram (Palmist) / Dooja Ram / Teeja Ram
 Mera Naam Joker (1970) - (uncredited)
 Safar (1970) - Kalidas
 Puraskar (1970) - Sumesh
 Aag Aur Daag (1970) - Murli - Taxi-driver
 Albela (1971)
 Chhoti Bahu (1971) - Premnath (Niku's dad)
 Thi Reeta (1971)
 Johar Mehmood in Hong Kong (1971) - Ramesh / Prince Pagadandi
 Jai Bangladesh (1971)
 Dost Aur Dushman (1971)
 Maalik Tere Bande Hum (1972)
 Doctor X (1972)
 Dastaan (1972) - Johar aka Birbal
 Roop Tera Mastana (1972) - Driver
 Gomti Ke Kinare (1972) - Seth Chellamal
 Tangewala (1972) - Nagina
 Banarasi Babu (1973) - Jackpot
 Joshila (1973) - Raunaq Singh
 Teen Chor (1973)
 Kashmakash (1973) - Private Detective Johar
 Intezar (1973)
 Intezaar (1973)
 Ek Mutthi Aasmaan (1973) - Pandit Kishorilal Sharma
 Aaj Ki Taaza Khabar (1973) - Ramji
 Trimurti (1974) - Shadilal
 5 Rifles (1974) - Harfan Mama
 Prem Shastra (1974) - Malhotra
 Do Nambar Ke Amir (1974) - Mr. Johar
 Do Aankhen (1974)
Badhti Ka Naam Daadhi (1974) 
 Maze Le Lo (1975)
 Zinda Dil (1975) - Pinto D'Souza / Daya Shankar
 Sankoch (1976) - Sangeet Samrat
 Khalifa (1976) - Diwan Manoharlal Agnihotri
 Yamla Jatt (1976) - Yamla Jatt
 Mazdoor Zindabaad (1976) - Kansraj (uncredited)
 Aaj Ka Ye Ghar (1976) - Painter
 Saheb Bahadur (1977) - Prof. Rampyare
 Jagriti (1977)
 Ek Aurat Do Joote (1978)
 Nasbandi (1978) - Himself
 Ganga Ki Saugandh (1978) - Birju Master
 Priyatama (1978) - Lawyer
 Death on the Nile (1978) - as Mr. Choudhury, Manager of the Karnak
 Premi Gangaram (1978)
 Ek Baap Chhe Bete (1978) - B.R.Choranjia
 Guru Ho Jaa Shuru (1979) - Curator D'Costa
 Ranjha Ikk Tey Heeran Do (1979) - Tota Ram
 Ramu To Diwana Hai (1980)
 Beqasoor (1980 film) - Dinanath
 Do Premee (1980) - Daulatram
 Be-Reham (1980) - Police Inspector Malpani
 Sanjh Ki Bela (1980)
 Raaz (1981)
 Do Posti (1981) - Makhan
 Guru Suleman Chela Pahelwan (1981) - Dharmatma
 Gopichand Jasoos (1982) - Ram Rokada / No. 256
 Teesri Aankh (1982) - Mirchandani
 Heeron Ka Chor (1982)
 Bad Aur Badnaam (1984) - Malpani (uncredited) (final film role)

Director

References

External links 
 

1920 births
1984 deaths
Forman Christian College alumni
Indian male film actors
Male actors in Hindi cinema
Hindi-language film directors
Film producers from Mumbai
Indian male screenwriters
Filmfare Awards winners
20th-century Indian male actors
Punjabi people
Pahari Pothwari people
People from Chakwal District
20th-century Indian screenwriters
20th-century Indian male writers